"Mi Última Carta" (English: "My Final Letter") is a 2010 song by American singer Prince Royce. The song was released in May 2011 as the fourth and final single taken from Royce's debut studio album, Prince Royce (2010).

Charts

References

2011 singles
2010 songs
Prince Royce songs
Songs written by Prince Royce
Spanish-language songs